PTK  may refer to:

 Pairwise Transient Key, a key in the IEEE 802.11i WPA2 specification
 Phi Theta Kappa, an international honor society
 Phototherapeutic keratectomy, laser eye surgery
 Pilotiruemyi Transportny Korabl Novogo Pokoleniya (PTK NP, lit. "New Generation Piloted Transport Ship"), a Roscosmos program to develop a reusable spacecraft
 Portal Three Kingdoms, a Magic: The Gathering card set
 Post and Telecom of Kosovo
 Protein Tyrosine Kinase, an enzyme
 PTK Toolkit, a C++ toolkit for creating MacOS and Windows cross-platform games
 Oakland County International Airport, a county-owned public-use airport located in Waterford, Michigan with IATA Code PTK
 P, T and K, the most common voiceless plosive consonants across all languages